The Carnegie Range is a mountain range of the Transantarctic Mountains System, in the Ross Dependency.

It was named by the Advisory Committee on Antarctic Names after Andrew Carnegie, American industrialist of Scottish birth who established numerous foundations and endowments for education, research, and social advancement, including the provision of public libraries in the United States, Great Britain, and other English speaking countries.

Features
Geographical features include:

 McClintock Ridge
 Rubin Peak

References 

Mountain ranges of the Ross Dependency
Transantarctic Mountains
Shackleton Coast